Doug Argue (born January 21, 1962 in Saint Paul, Minnesota) is an American painter based in New York City, New York, United States.

Career

After attending art classes at Bemidji State University and the University of Minnesota from 1980 to 1983, Argue's early figurative works were influenced by German Expressionism. During his two different trips to Venice, he was deeply moved by such 16th-century Italian painters as Titian and Tintoretto, whose massive Crucifixion moved him to begin creating more large-scale works.

In 1989, after the birth of his son, Mattison, Argue's work started being characterized by the use of parts to render the idea of a whole. He chose chickens as protagonists in a saga where conventionally neglected creatures were turned into subjugated minorities.

Since 1983, Argue's work has been exhibited in numerous solo and group exhibitions in Europe, Australia and the United States. His first museum show was a 1985 Viewpoints exhibition at Walker Art Center in Minneapolis.

Artwork in the World Trade Center

In November 2014, three large oil paintings by Argue (Randomly Placed Exact Percentages (2009-2013), Genesis (2007-09) and Isotropic (2009-2013)) were installed in the lobby of One World Trade Center as part of the art collection of the Port Authority of New York and New Jersey, which owns the building.

56th Venice Biennale

In 2015, during the Venice Biennale he exhibited Scattered Rhymes  in the Palazzo Contarini Dal Zaffo on the Grand Canal.

Special project (2018)

In 2018, his work Footfalls Echo in Memory (2017), a re-visitation of Picasso’s Les Demoiselles d'Avignon, was both the source for choreography and part of the scenography for News of the World, a dance show performed by ODC/Dance.

Publications 

Doug Argue: Letters to the Future (Skira, 2020)

Selected exhibitions

 Minneapolis Institute of Art
 Walker Art Center

Minnesota Museum of American Art 
 Weisman Art Museum
 Grand Rapids Art Museum
 Cafesjian Museum of Art, Yerevan, Armenia
 Port Authority, World Trade Center, NY
 Target Corporation, Minneapolis, MN
 Minneapolis Public Library, Minneapolis, MN

Awards and recognition

 National Endowment for the Arts Fellowship (1987)
 Rome Prize (1997)
 Pollock-Krasner Foundation Grant (1995)
 Bush Foundation Fellowship (1988)
 London International Creative Competition First Prize (2009)

References

External links
 

1962 births
Living people
American male painters
Painters from New York (state)
20th-century American painters
21st-century American painters
20th-century American male artists